Victoria Elaine "Vickie" Orr (born February 25, 1967) is an American retired women's basketball player. She was a member of the United States women's national basketball team during the late 1980s and the early 1990s, collecting two medals during her international career. Born in Hartselle, Alabama, Orr played college basketball for Auburn University. In May 2013, she was inducted into the Alabama Sports Hall of Fame.

Auburn statistics
Source

USA Basketball
Orr was named to the first USA Basketball Women's Junior National Team (now called the U19 team). The team participated in the inaugural Junior World Championship, held in Colorado Springs, Colorado, in August 1985. The team won four games and lost two, ending up in fifth place. Orr averaged 3.8 points per game.

Orr was selected to be a member of the team representing the US at the 1987 World University Games held in Zagreb, Yugoslavia. However, Orr was unable to play as she had to have her appendix removed in Yugoslavia. The USA team won four of the five contests. In the opening game against Poland, Gordon was the leading scorer for the US with 18 points. After winning their next game against Finland, the USA faced the host team Yugoslavia. The game went to overtime, but Yugoslavia prevailed, 93–89. The USA faced China in the next game. They won 84–83, but they needed to win by at least five points to remain in medal contention. They won the final game against Canada to secure fifth place.

Orr was a member of the USA National team at the 1990 World Championships, held in Kuala Lumpur, Malaysia. The team won their opening round games fairly easily, with the closest of the first three games a 27-point victory over Czechoslovakia. Then they faced Cuba, a team that had beaten the US in exhibition matches only a few weeks earlier. The USA team was losing at halftime, but came back to win 87–78. The USA team found itself behind at halftime to Canada in their next game, but came back to win easily 95–70. After an easy match against Bulgaria, the USA team faced Czechoslovakia again, end achieved an almost identical result, winning 87–59. In the title match, the USA team won the gold medal with a score of 88–78. Orr averaged 7.9 points per game and had nine blocks over the course of the event, second highest on the team.

Personal life
Orr is the mother of Auburn men's basketball player Austin Wiley.

References

 

1967 births
Living people
All-American college women's basketball players
American women's basketball players
Auburn Tigers women's basketball players
Basketball players at the 1992 Summer Olympics
Basketball players from Alabama
Medalists at the 1992 Summer Olympics
Olympic bronze medalists for the United States in basketball
People from Hartselle, Alabama
United States women's national basketball team players